Stefan Semmler (born 5 May 1952) is a retired East German rower. Competing in coxless fours he won Olympic gold medals in 1976 and 1980, as well as four world championships in 1974–1979.

References 

1952 births
Living people
Olympic rowers of East Germany
Rowers at the 1976 Summer Olympics
Rowers at the 1980 Summer Olympics
Olympic gold medalists for East Germany
Olympic medalists in rowing
East German male rowers
World Rowing Championships medalists for East Germany
Medalists at the 1980 Summer Olympics
Medalists at the 1976 Summer Olympics
European Rowing Championships medalists
People from Zschopau
Sportspeople from Saxony